The 1968 United States Senate election in Alabama took place on November 5, 1968. 
Incumbent Democratic U.S. Senator J. Lister Hill retired. He was succeeded by Lieutenant Governor of Alabama James Allen, who won a hotly contested primary over Armistead I. Selden Jr. In the general election, Allen easily defeated Republican Probate Judge Perry O. Hooper Sr. and National Democratic nominee Robert Schwenn.

Democratic primary

Candidates
 James B. Allen, Lieutenant Governor of Alabama
 John G. Crommelin, retired U.S. Navy Rear Admiral and white supremacist
 Jim Folsom, former Governor of Alabama
 Armistead I. Selden Jr., U.S. Representative from Greensboro
 Bob Smith, Huntsville attorney
 Margaret Stewart, genealogist and historian

Results

Run-off
Because no candidate received a majority in the first round, Allen and Selden advanced to a run-off election on June 4.

General election

General election results by county

See also 
 1968 United States Senate elections

Notes

References

1968
Alabama
United States Senate